Afrocantharellus is a genus of fungi in the family Cantharellaceae. It was originally named as a subgenus of Cantharellus, but was elevated to the rank of genus by Donatha D. Tibuhwa in 2012 based on morphological and molecular evidence. Afrocantharellus species are only known from Africa.

References

External links

Cantharellaceae
Agaricomycetes genera